Villepinte is a commune in the northeastern suburbs of Paris, France. It is near the Charles de Gaulle Airport. The Parc des Expositions de Villepinte is located in the city. , the city had a population of 36,830.

Population

Heraldry

Transport
Villepinte is served by three stations on Paris RER line B: Villepinte, Parc des Expositions, and Vert-Galant.

Twin towns – sister cities

Villepinte is twinned with:
 Schwendi, Germany

Notable people
Stella Akakpo, athlete
Lindsay Burlet, handball player
Alou Diarra, footballer
Boukary Dramé, footballer
Alassane També, footballer
Diandra Tchatchouang, basketball player 
Ibrahima Traoré, footballer
Saïd Taghmaoui, actor
Taylor Lapilus, mixed martial artist

Education
The commune has ten preschools (maternelles), as well as 11 elementary schools.

Secondary schools:
Four junior high schools: Collège Françoise Dolto, Collège Camille Claudel, Collège Jean Jaurès, Collège Les Mousseaux
Two senior high schools/sixth-form colleges: Lycée Jean Rostand and Lycée Georges Brassens

See also

Communes of the Seine-Saint-Denis department

References

External links

Official website (in French)

Communes of Seine-Saint-Denis